International High School may refer to:

Australia
 Banksia Park International High School, Adelaide, South Australia

United States
 International High School (New Jersey), Paterson, New Jersey
 International High School (Queens), New York City
 International High School at Prospect Heights, New York City
 Washington Irving Campus, New York City
 International High School of New Orleans, New Orleans
 International High School of San Francisco, San Francisco
 Houston Academy for International Studies, Houston
 Sharpstown International School, Texas